Formalization or formalisation may refer to

 Formal system in formal logic
 Drafting formal specifications
 A process enhancing bureaucracy in sociology